Sir Michael Joseph Tighe  (1864–1925) was a British Army general who served in East Africa during World War I.

Biography
Tighe was born on 21 May 1864. He graduated from Sandhurst Military College and was commissioned in the British Army in 1883; joining the new Leinster Regiment. He served in the Third Anglo-Burmese War, in Burma, China, East Africa and Persia, and also received the Order of the Brilliant Star of Zanzibar (2nd class).
Tighe commanded the 56th Punjabi Rifles before retiring in 1913.

He returned to service during World War I, serving as a Brigadier-General in the East African Campaign against the Germans under Colonel Paul von Lettow-Vorbeck. In 1917 he was posted to India and later retired again, with the rank of Lieutenant-General.

He died in London on 5 September 1925.

References

1864 births
1925 deaths
Indian Army generals of World War I
British military personnel of the Third Anglo-Burmese War
Graduates of the Royal Military College, Sandhurst
Knights Commander of the Order of St Michael and St George
Knights Commander of the Order of the Bath
Companions of the Order of the Indian Empire
Companions of the Distinguished Service Order
Prince of Wales's Leinster Regiment officers